Guashize Township (Mandarin: 瓜什则乡) is a township in Tongren County, Huangnan Tibetan Autonomous Prefecture, Qinghai, China. In 2010, Guashize Township had a total population of 4,355: 2,165 males and 2,190 females: 1,114 aged under 14, 2,960 aged between 15 and 65 and 281 aged over 65.

References 

Township-level divisions of Qinghai
Huangnan Tibetan Autonomous Prefecture